The sixth series of MasterChef New Zealand was announced in October 2014 in a TV3 lineup after TVNZ axed the series after 5 seasons. It premiered on 26 July 2015. Al Brown and New Zealand Co-Restaurateurs of the Year Mark Wallbank join the judging panel with Josh Emett, replacing Ray McVinnie and Simon Gault. Episodes aired on Sundays and Mondays.

Contestants

Elimination chart

Colour Key:
 This contestant won the competition.
 This contestant was the runner-up.
 This contestant was immune and did not have to cook in the elimination challenge.
 This contestant won the challenge and got a privilege in the next challenge.
 This contestant performed well in the challenge.
 This contestant was in the winning team.
 This contestant was in the bottom group.
 This contestant was eliminated.
 This contestant withdrew from the competition.
There was no elimination in this episode

Episodes

References

Series 6
2015 New Zealand television seasons